Cispius is a genus of African nursery web spiders that was first described by Eugène Louis Simon in 1898.

Species
 it contains nine species, found only in Africa:
Cispius affinis Lessert, 1916 – East Africa
Cispius bidentatus Lessert, 1936 – Central, East Africa
Cispius kimbius Blandin, 1978 – South Africa
Cispius maruanus (Roewer, 1955) – West, Central Africa
Cispius problematicus Blandin, 1978 – Congo
Cispius simoni Lessert, 1915 – East Africa
Cispius strandi Caporiacco, 1947 – East Africa
Cispius thorelli Blandin, 1978 – Congo
Cispius variegatus Simon, 1898 (type) – Congo

See also
 List of Pisauridae species

References

Araneomorphae genera
Pisauridae
Spiders